Gérard Letast (born 28 January 1949) is a French former swimmer. He competed in two events at the 1968 Summer Olympics.

References

External links
 

1949 births
Living people
French male freestyle swimmers
Olympic swimmers of France
Swimmers at the 1968 Summer Olympics
People from Verdun
Sportspeople from Meuse (department)